Yealand Conyers is a village and civil parish in the English county  of Lancashire. It is in the City of Lancaster district.

Community
The community is in the same electoral district as Yealand Redmayne and Silverdale. The Yealands and Silverdale were originally in the same manor of Yealand in the Doomsday Book.

Yealand Conyers has three religious institutions, the Church of England St John's and Catholic St Mary's but is particularly of note for its early support of Quakerism. Richard Hubberthorne, one of the early Quaker preachers was from the Yealands. George Fox preached a sermon in the village in 1652 and the village's Meeting House dates from 1692. The Quaker's Old School is today used as a simple hostel and can host people visiting the '1652 country'.

The village has both a manor house and a stately home Leighton Hall. The bulk of the Leighton Moss RSPB reserve is in Yealand Conyers but main visitor access is from Silverdale.

Yealand Conyers was for many years home to the noted manchester born Quaker writer Elfrida Vipont Foulds. She was the Headmistress of the Yealand Manor Quaker Evacuation School.

Geography
Like its neighbour, Yealand Redmayne, it is north of Lancaster, and close to the border of Cumbria.

To the north is Yealand Redmayne and beyond that is Beetham and Milnthorpe, to its north east is Holme and Arnside, with the River Kent to the north west while Warton is to the south.

Gallery

See also

Listed buildings in Yealand Conyers

References

External links 

 

Villages in Lancashire
Civil parishes in Lancashire
Geography of the City of Lancaster